Romus et Rapidus is a river rapids ride operating at Parc Astérix, in Plailly, France. The ride evokes the Roman mythology tale of Romulus and Remus, the mythical founders of Rome. In 2006, a young boy fell from his raft and drowned in the ride's roaring current.

References

Water rides manufactured by Intamin